Francesca Quondamcarlo (born 21 August 1984) is an Italian épée fencer. She won a gold medal with Italy in the 2009 World Fencing Championships and a silver medal in the 2013 European Fencing Championships.

References

1985 births
Living people
Fencers from Rome
Italian female épée fencers